This article contains an overview of the year 1991 in athletics.

International Events

 All-Africa Games
 Asian Championships
 Central American and Caribbean Championships
 Mediterranean Games
 Pan American Games
 South American Championships
 World Championships
 World Cross Country Championships
 World Indoor Championships
 World Student Games

World records

Men

The relay team of the United States in the men's 4x100m, formed by Michael Marsh, Leroy Burrell, Floyd Heard and Carl Lewis, equal the current world record, set the previous year by France at the European Championships, clocking 37.79 on 1991-08-03 at a meet in Monaco. The first mark was set by Max Morinière, Daniel Sangouma, Jean-Charles Trouabal and Bruno Marie-Rose on 1990-09-01 in Split, Yugoslavia.

Women

Men's Best Year Performers

100 metres
Main race this year: World Championships 100 metres

200 metres
Main race this year: World Championships 200 metres

400 metres
Main race this year: World Championships 400 metres

800 metres
Main race this year: World Championships 800 metres

1,500 metres
Main race this year: World Championships 1,500 metres

Mile

3,000 metres

5,000 metres
Main race this year: World Championships 5,000 metres

10,000 metres
Main race this year: World Championships 10,000 metres

Half Marathon

Marathon
Main race this year: World Championships Marathon

110m Hurdles
Main race this year: World Championships 110m Hurdles

400m Hurdles
Main race this year: World Championships 400m Hurdles

3,000m Steeplechase
Main race this year: World Championships 3,000m Steeplechase

High Jump
Main competition this year: World Championships High Jump

Long Jump
Main competition this year: World Championships Long Jump

Triple Jump
Main competition this year: World Championships Triple Jump

Discus
Main competition this year: World Championships Discus Throw

Shot Put
Main competition this year: World Championships Shot Put

Hammer

Javelin (new design)
Main competition this year: World Championships Javelin Throw

Pole Vault
Main competition this year: World Championships Pole Vault

Decathlon

Women's Best Year Performers

60 metres

100 metres
Main race this year: World Championships 100 metres

200 metres
Main race this year: World Championships 200 metres

400 metres

800 metres
Main race this year: World Championships 800 metres

1,500 metres
Main race this year: World Championships 1,500 metres

Mile

3,000 metres
Main race this year: World Championships 3,000 metres

5,000 metres

10,000 metres
Main race this year: World Championships 10,000 metres

Half Marathon

Marathon
Main race this year: World Championships Marathon

60m Hurdles

100m Hurdles
Main race this year: World Championships 100m Hurdles

400m Hurdles
Main race this year: World Championships 400m Hurdles

High Jump
Main competition this year: World Championships High Jump

Long Jump
Main competition this year: World Championships Long Jump

Triple Jump

Shot Put
Main competition this year: World Championships Shot Put

Javelin (old design)
Main competition this year: World Championships Javelin

Heptathlon
Main competition this year: World Championships Heptathlon

Births
January 15 — Darya Klishina, Russian long jumper
May 8 — Kalkidan Gezahegne, Ethiopian distance runner

Deaths
January 1 — Inga Gentzel (82), Swedish athlete (b. 1908)
August 10 — Ellen Braumüller (80), German athlete (b. 1910)

References
 Year Lists
 1991 Year Rankings
 Association of Road Racing Statisticians

 
Athletics (track and field) by year